The Bicycle Kitchen/La Bicicocina is an educational non-profit bicycle workspace in the Los Angeles neighborhood of East Hollywood. The Bicycle Kitchen's mission is to promote the bicycle as a fun, safe, and accessible form of transportation, to foster healthy urban communities, and to provide a welcoming space to learn about building, maintaining, and riding bicycles. 

The Bicycle Kitchen is entirely run by volunteers and is supported by small individual donations from its everyday clients. Some clients support the Bicycle Kitchen through cash donations, while others donate their time and effort to help clean and organize the space. The community’s continuing generosity means that no one needs to be turned away simply for lack of funds. 

They do not buy, sell, or fix bikes. They teach people to work on their bikes. Although they don’t sell bikes, community members will price a “Project” and ask for a suggested donation. A Project is a bike you build in the kitchen with some or all of our used parts. A price is decided upon at the beginning based on the basic parts you will be working with and the amount you can afford. Many people have built entire bikes from recycled parts.

The Bicycle Kitchen shares the culture of many traditional bicycle cooperatives. Many of the most dedicated volunteers at the Los Angeles Bicycle Kitchen have been members of bicycle cooperatives in other parts of America and around the world. New volunteers are constantly joining the Bicycle Kitchen, and while a knowledge of bicycle mechanics is helpful to volunteers, it is not essential. The only prerequisite is the willingness to engage with people of all backgrounds in a constructive and supportive way.

Volunteering at the Bicycle Kitchen is a way to find and connect with like-minded individuals who share interests. The Bicycle Kitchen is part of a more significant do-it-yourself movement and shares many aspects of open-source culture.

Visiting The Bicycle Kitchen 
The Bicycle Kitchen is located at 4429 Fountain Ave in East Hollywood, two blocks south of the large intersection where Hollywood Blvd. and Sunset Blvd meet. 

It is South of the Vons on Virgil and West of Sunset Nursery and Akbar on Fountain. 

The closest subway stop is Vermont / Sunset on the Red Line. Then, walk one block South and two blocks East to reach the Kitchen.

Because volunteers run the Bicycle Kitchen with changing schedules, it does not always open on time. However, it doesn’t hurt to call ahead to ask if they are open.

The phone number is (323) 662-2776, but the phone usually is only answered when the Kitchen is open.

Please understand that the Coronavirus Pandemic has significantly changed Bicycle Kitchen’s hours of operation. 

The Kitchen is open for a few hours per week until the situation stabilizes.

History 
The name “bicycle kitchen” is a version of the more common term “bike kitchen,” a popular name among community bicycle organizations. However, the L.A. Bicycle Kitchen has played no small part in popularizing the name throughout the past two decades. The origins of Los Angeles’ Bicycle Kitchen date back to 2002, when a tiny bicycle repair workshop was set up in an unused apartment in an intentional community known as the Los Angeles Eco-Village. Jimmy Lizama, a resident and local bicycle messenger, cooked food and encouraged others to join him for evenings of bikes, pizza, and beer. Soon other kindred spirits joined the group, including Ben Guzman, Aaron Salinger, and Randy Metz. The bicycle kitchen became a community resource and a local hot spot for bicycle enthusiasts the following year.

By the winter of 2004, the small space could not accommodate the number of people attending, so the loosely organized group of volunteers decided to find a different space and become a collectively run non-profit organization.

In 2005, Ben Guzman signed the lease that brought the Bicycle Kitchen into the forefront of the public’s eye by moving it from the confines of the Eco-Village storefront at Melrose and Heliotrope. The neighborhood that the Bicycle Kitchen moved into was in rapid transition and quickly became filled with like-minded supportive entrepreneurial young businesses, namely: Scoops (ice cream), Pure Luck (vegan food and beer), Vlad the Retailer (craft items, venue), and Orange 20 (boutique bicycle shop).

In 2010, after years of successive rent increases at their location in what was coming to be called “The Bicycle District” and fearing that the Bicycle Kitchen might get priced out of the neighborhood, it became clear that the bicycle Kitchen should purchase a building.

In May 2012, after a very successful fundraising campaign, the Bicycle Kitchen could move into a larger space only 1.4 miles away from their beloved old neighborhood. Their new home is in a former bakery at 4429 Fountain Avenue.

References 

Los Angeles Times Magazine, November 2, 2003
https://web.archive.org/web/20140812192155/http://andrewvontz.com/los-angeles-times-bicycle-kitchen-nov-2-2003/

External links 
The Bicycle Kitchen
The Bicycle Kitchen Wiki

2002 establishments in California
Cycling in California
Non-profit organizations based in Los Angeles